Nebria klapperichi is a species of ground beetle in the Nebriinae subfamily that is endemic to Afghanistan.

References

klapperichi
Beetles described in 1955
Beetles of Asia
Endemic fauna of Afghanistan